Franz Weitlaner (1872–1944) was an Austrian physician who is known for designing the self-retaining retractor bearing his name.

Life
Weitlaner was born in Welsberg, a German-speaking municipality in Italy's South Tyrol province. His initial higher education was in theology, but at the age of 20 he began medical studies at the University of Innsbruck, where he completed his doctorate in 1898 and his clinical training in 1902. After a stint as a ship's surgeon, he married Leopoldine (née Kraubmann), and established a general practice in the remote village of Ottenthal. Lacking adequate surgical assistants there, he developed the retractor which bears his name, publishing an article on its genesis and design in 1905. Weitlaner departed Ottenthal in 1909 to take up similar positions in rural Austria.

References

1872 births
1944 deaths
Austrian general practitioners
Austrian inventors
University of Innsbruck alumni
People from Welsberg-Taisten